The 2017 Exeter Sevens was the final tournament of the 2017 Sevens Grand Prix Series, hosted in Sandy Park at Exeter. Russia won the tournament, defeating Wales in the final. Ireland's Jordan Conroy was named player of the tournament.

This tournament settled the two European teams to be invited to the 2018 Rugby World Cup Sevens, with Russia and Ireland progressing.

Teams

Pool stage

Pool A

Pool B

Pool C

Knockout stage

Challenge Trophy

5th place

Cup

Overall

References

External links
 Official page 

2017
2017–18 in English rugby union
Grand Prix 4